Simensbråten was a light rail tram stop on the Oslo Tramway.

Located at Simensbråten in Nordstrand, it was the terminus of the Simensbråten Line which was opened in 1931 as a side branch of the Ekeberg Line. The Simensbråten Line was closed on 29 October 1967. The area is currently served by Ryen Station on the Oslo Metro.

References

Ekeberg
Oslo Tramway stations in Oslo
Railway stations opened in 1931
Railway stations closed in 1967
Disused Oslo Tramway stations
1931 establishments in Norway
1967 disestablishments in Norway